Heliconius atthis, the false zebra longwing or Atthis longwing, is a species of Heliconius butterfly. It is endemic to western Ecuador.

Is a mimic of the zebra longwing (Heliconius charithonia).

References

atthis
Nymphalidae of South America
Butterflies of South America
Butterflies described in 1847